HD 173936 is a star in the northern constellation of Lyra. It has a blue-white hue and is just barely visible to the naked eye with an apparent visual magnitude of 6.06. Based upon parallax measurements, the star is located at a distance of approximately 900 light years from the Sun, and has an absolute magnitude of −1.14. It is drifting closer with a radial velocity of −19 km/s.

This object is a B-type main-sequence star with a stellar classification of B6 V. It is around 22.4 million years old with 4.6 times the mass of the Sun and has a high rate of spin, showing a projected rotational velocity of 116 km/s. It is radiating 701 times the luminosity of the Sun from its photosphere at an effective temperature of 13,932 K.

References

B-type main-sequence stars
Lyra (constellation)
Durchmusterung objects
173936
092098
7073